Brennan and Braonán are masculine given names, Brennan is also a feminine given name. The given name Brennan is considered to be mainly an Irish or Gaelic name. The Irish surname Brennan, which in one form appears in Irish as Ó Braonáin, meaning "descendant of Braonán". The Gaelic personal name Braonán is derived from the Irish braon, meaning "sorrow". In some cases the given name Brennan may be a contracted form of the given name Brendan.

People
Brennan Bernardino (born 1992), American baseball player
Brennan Boesch (born 1985), American baseball player
Brennan Brown (born 1968), American film and television actor
Brennan Carroll (born 1979), American college football coach
Brennan Clost (born 1994), Canadian dancer and actor
Brennan Curtin (born 1980), American football offensive tackle
Brennan Elliott (born 1975), Canadian actor
Brennan Evans (born 1982), Canadian ice hockey player
Brennan Heart, stage name of Fabian Bohn (born 1982), Dutch DJ and producer of hardstyle
Brennan Hesser (born 1980), American television actress
Brennan Johnson (born 2001), Welsh assocociation footballer
Brennan LaBrie (born 1999), American journalist for Time for Kids
Brennan Manning (1934–2013), American author, laicized priest, and public speaker
Brennan Mejia (born 1989), American actor who stars as Tyler Navarro, the red ranger in Power Rangers Dino Charge
Brennan Lee Mulligan (born 1988), American comedian, writer, performer, and gamemaster
Brennan Newberry (born 1990), American stock car racing driver
Brennan Poole (born 1991), American stock car racing driver
Brennan Rubie (born 1991), American alpine ski racer
Brennan Scarlett (born 1993), American football outside linebacker
Brennan Stack (born 1988), Australian rules footballer
Brennan Taylor, American role-playing games author and publisher
Brennan Ward (born 1988), American mixed martial artist

See also
Brenan, given name and surname
Brennen, given name and surname

References

English-language masculine given names